WEFT (90.1 MHz) is a listener-supported community radio station in Champaign, Illinois, founded in 1981 and owned by Prairie Air, Inc., a not-for-profit corporation. WEFT typically broadcasts 24 hours per day and 7 days per week. It has a wide range of programming, including music from a range of genres, local and nationally produced public affairs programming, live music, spoken word, and more.

History
WEFT had its beginnings in 1975 as community members began work to create a new radio station. In 1980 WEFT began to broadcast on the local cable TV network and acquired studio space at 113 N. Market Street in Champaign. This location is still the WEFT operations base. On September 26, 1981 WEFT went on the air as an FM radio station broadcasting at 90.1 MHz. Initially WEFT was a less–than–1,000–watt station with the transmitter and antenna located atop a nearby hotel. In 1991 WEFT/Prairie Air Inc. purchased the building at 113 N. Market Street and within 9 years paid off the mortgage.

In 1988 WEFT acquired a 10,000–watt transmitter and new broadcast antenna designed for a new transmission site located on a hill NW of Champaign. WEFT began to broadcast in stereo at this time. The 10,000–watt transmitter which had been installed in 1988 was replaced in 2008 after a lightning strike damaged the older tube–type transmitter. The current transmitter is solid state.

Broadcast range
In addition to broadcasting at 90.1 on the FM band, WEFT streams their programming live, 24 hours per day, on the internet. It streams at 128 Kbps. The reduced power to the east is required to avoid interference with a neighboring station located in Indiana.

Affiliations
WEFT is a member of the National Federation of Community Broadcasters.

See also
List of community radio stations in the United States

References

External links

EFT
Community radio stations in the United States
Champaign, Illinois
Urbana, Illinois